South Park is an American animated television series created by Trey Parker and Matt Stone for the Comedy Central television network. Throughout the series, various celebrities have been impersonated (poorly) by the show's creators. However numerous celebrities have guest-starred in the following episodes.

Season 1
 Episode 4: "Big Gay Al's Big Gay Boat Ride"
 George Clooney as Sparky
 Episode 10: "Damien (South Park)"
 Michael Buffer as himself
 Episode 11: "Tom's Rhinoplasty"
 Natasha Henstridge (credited as "The Chick from Species" in the opening credits) as Ms. Ellen
 Episode 12: "Mecha-Streisand"
 Robert Smith as himself
 Episode 13: "Cartman's Mom Is a Dirty Slut"
 Jay Leno as Mr. Kitty

Season 2
 Episode 7: "City on the Edge of Forever"
 Henry Winkler as the Kid-Eating Monster
 Jay Leno as himself
 Brent Musburger as Scuzzlebutt's leg
 Episode 8: "Summer Sucks"
 Jonathan Katz as Dr. Katz
 Episode 14: "Chef Aid"
 Joe Strummer as himself
 Rancid as themselves
 Ozzy Osbourne as himself
 Ween as themselves
 Primus as themselves
 Elton John as himself
 Meat Loaf as himself
 Rick James as himself
 DMX as himself
 Devo as themselves

Season 3
 Episode 1: "Rainforest Shmainforest"
 Jennifer Aniston as Miss Stevens
 Episode 10: "Korn's Groovy Pirate Ghost Mystery"
 Korn (Jonathan Davis, James Shaffer, Brian Welch, Reginald Arvizu, David Silveria) as themselves

Season 4
 Episode 1: "The Tooth Fairy's Tats 2000"
 Richard Belzer as Loogie
 Episode 6: "Cherokee Hair Tampons"
 Cheech Marin as Carlos Ramirez
 Tommy Chong as Chief Running Pinto
 Episode 12: "Trapper Keeper"
 Kief Davidson (credited as Keef Davidson) as Kindergarteners
 Episode 13: "Helen Keller! The Musical"
 Kief Davidson (credited as Keef Davidson) as Kindergarteners
 Episode 14: "Pip"
 Malcolm McDowell as narrator ("A British Person")
 Episode 17: "A Very Crappy Christmas"
 Louis Price (credited as Lewis Price) as Cornwallis' singing voice

Season 5
 Episode 4: "Scott Tenorman Must Die"
 Radiohead as themselves

Season 7
 Episode 4: "I'm a Little Bit Country"
 Norman Lear as Benjamin Franklin

Season 9
 Episode 3: "Wing"
 Wing as herself

Season 10
 Episode 1: "The Return of Chef"
 Peter Serafinowicz as Darth Chef

Season 15
 Episode 7: "You're Getting Old"
 Bill Hader as farmer #2

Season 16
 Episode 6: "I Should Have Never Gone Ziplining"
 Michael Zazarino as Live action Stan
 Brandon Hardesty as Live action Cartman
 Episode 7: "Cartman Finds Love"
 Brad Paisley as himself

Season 17
 Episode 1: "Let Go, Let Gov"
 Bill Hader as Alec Baldwin

 Episode 5: "Taming Strange"
 Bill Hader as Plex

Season 18
 Episode 3: "The Cissy"
 Sia as Lorde
 Episode 7: "Grounded Vindaloop"
 Bill Hader as Steve
 Episode 8: "Cock Magic"
 Peter Serafinowicz as Match Commentator
 Episode 9: "#REHASH"
 PewDiePie as himself
 Episode 10: "#HappyHolograms"
Bill Hader as Steve
 PewDiePie as himself

Season 19
Episode 7: "Naughty Ninjas"
 Bill Hader as Tom
Episode 8: "Sponsored Content"
 Bill Hader as Tom
Episode 9: "Truth and Advertising"
 Bill Hader as Tom

Season 20
 Episode 8: "Members Only"
 Elon Musk as himself
 Episode 9: "Not Funny"
 Elon Musk as himself
 Episode 10: "The End of Serialization as We Know It"
 Elon Musk as himself

Season 21
 Episode 5: "Hummels & Heroin"
 Josh Gad as Marcus Preston

Season 22
 Episode 5: "The Scoots"
 Lex Lang as The Narrator

References 

Guest stars
South Park